Valverde de Valdelacasa is a village and municipality in the province of Salamanca,  western Spain, part of the autonomous community of Castile-Leon. It is located 63 kilometres from the provincial capital city of Salamanca and has a population of 76 people.

Geography
The municipality covers an area of 8 km².  It lies 803 metres above sea level and the postal code is 37791.

See also
 List of municipalities in Salamanca

References

Municipalities in the Province of Salamanca